Kodupunna Govinda Ganakan (1921–1988) was an Indian multilingual scholar and essayist, born in Koduppunna village of Kuttanadu in the state of Kerala. A Malayalam prose translation of Kālidāsa's Sanskrit lyric poem Meghadūta is one of his famous works.

References

1921 births
1988 deaths
20th-century Indian essayists
20th-century Indian translators